Israel Meir Goodovitch (born 1934) is an Israeli architect and urban designer, known mostly as the former City Engineer of Tel Aviv-Yafo.

Biography
Goodovitch was born in Haifa, son of Ya’akov and Frida, who was the granddaughter of Rabi Arie leib Hacohen Popka and the great-granddaughter of Chofetz Chaim, Yisrael Meir Kagan. He was born 4 months after the death of Chofetz Chaim, and was named after him.
Israel graduated Tichon Hadash high school in Haifa, and studied architecture in the Technion – Israel Institute of Technology

Professional career
In 1959 Goodovitch received an award from Israeli Histadrut Fund for Young Creators.

Between the years 1961 and 1963, he was a student of Kenzo Tange in the Department of Architecture of Tokyo University. He joined the group of architects Arata Isozaki and Reiko Tomita and was part of the group that planned the Olympic complex of the 1964 Olympic games in Tokyo. He received a Ph.D. in urban design from the Department of Architecture, Tokyo University in 1963.

In 1964 Goodovitch came back to Israel and served as director of Planning and Design in the Israeli Ministry of Housing. In 1973, Goodovitch joined Israeli Transportation Highway company, where he served as a consultant advisor until 1975. While in office, Goodovitch planned the Division of Steel Six Days War monument in Yamit, Sinai.

Between 1975 and 1998, Goodovitch was the head planner of several projects, including:
  “The Growing House” (“Envelope System”), Or-Yehuda, Israel, 1975–1978.
  Indoor Basketball Hall, 3,500 seats, Zemach, Israel, 1976.
  Olympic Stadium, 60,000 seats, Johannesburg, Pretoria, South Africa, 1983.
  Olympic Stadium, 60,000 seats, Pretoria, South Africa, 1985.
  10,000 low cost housing units, Johannesburg, Pretoria, South Africa, 1986–1987.
 Holiday Inn Hotel, Tiberias, Israel, 1982–1985.
  “Sonol” Gas station, Shaar Haaliya, Haifa, Israel, 1980.
  “City Tower”, High-rise office-building, Tel-Aviv, Israel, 1995.
  New-York Skyscraper - idea project for George Klein Co., N.Y., 1986–1987.
  “Moscow hotel”, “Acor group”, Paris-Lion-Jerusalem, 1998.

Tel Aviv-Yafo City Engineer 
In 1998 Goodovitch joined the Ron Huldai campaign for mayor of Tel Aviv-Yafo. During the campaign period, Goodovitch was the first to coin the term “The Historic City of Tel Aviv-Yafo”. After Huldai's victory, Goodovitch was appointed as Tel Aviv-Yafo 10th City Engineer.

In March 1999, two months after he was appointed Tel-Aviv City Engineer, Goodovitch manifested his vision to the public, in a presentation called “If you wish it… 1999”. It was there where he coined the phrase “The historical city of Tel Aviv”, referring to the borders later acknowledged by UNESCO as “The White City.”
In that same constitutive event, Goodovitch announced that the vacant area north of the Yarkon river delta up to Herzliya's border will be declared open for prospect planning and remain a development reserve for future generations.

Goodovitch served in office, defining the future development of Israel's central metropolitan, until he retired in 2000, at the age of 66. 
11 years later, in 2011, Goodovitch issued his grand plan for Tel Aviv - "A city from the Sea". It was a groundbreaking vision, focused on tackling the high density in the central parts of the city, bringing back the view, the breeze, and the sunlight to each and every resident.

In the program, Goodovitch was the first to suggest the shutdown of Sde Dov Hoz airport, and the construction of living neighborhoods in "Hagush hagadol", northern of the Yarkon river, and building an airport on an artificial island, 1.5 km offshore.

He was also one of the first architects to oppose Huldai's plan for a light rail in the Tel Aviv metropolitan, proposing a much simpler, practical solution - a “Green Ring” of bus lines, circling the center of Tel Aviv.

Later works
In the year 2000 Goodovitch served as chairman of the Israel Institute of Architects & Town Planners. In 2004, he became a special assistant to Zurab Tchiaberashvili, Mayor of Tbilisi.

In 2004, Goodovitch established his private office, “Goodovitch Architects”.
Since 2005, Goodovitch is the chairman of “United Architects & Engineers of Israel”.

Private life
Israel got married with Erela, a fellow architect and his business partner, in the 1950s. The couple has two sons: public transportation expert Tomer Goodovitch, and architect Dekel Goodovitch.

Publications
  “Architecturology”- published by George Allen & Unwin, London, U.K., 1967.
 “Red Tape”- Homage to Prof. N. Parkinson, published by “Mabat” art gallery, Tel-Aviv, 1980.
 “40X40” 40 High-Rises 40 Years, Am Oved Publishers, Tel-Aviv, 2007.

Gallery

See also

Architecture in Israel

External links

References

1934 births
Living people
Israeli architects
Israeli Jews
People from Tel Aviv
Big Brother (franchise) contestants